David Moore may refer to:

Politics
 David E. Moore (1798-1875), American politician in Virginia
 David Moore (Australian politician) (1824–1898), politician in Sandridge, Victoria, Australia
 David Moore (Manx politician), member of the House of Keys, 1978–1986
 David H. Moore, member of the Chicago City Council
 David R. Moore (1856–1926), physician and political figure in New Brunswick, Canada

Science
 David Moore (botanist born 1808) (1808–1879), Scottish botanist
 David Moore (botanist born 1933) (1933–2013), British botanist
 David Moore (psychologist) (born 1960), American psychologist

Sports
 David Moore (American football) (born 1995), American football player
 David Moore (cricket coach) (born 1964), Australian cricketer and coach
 David Moore (footballer, born 1985), English former football striker
 David Moore (rugby league) (born 1988), Papua New Guinean rugby league footballer
 David Moore (rugby union) (born 1987), rugby union player
 David Moore (sport shooter) (born 1953), Australian pistol shooter and Olympic athlete
 Davey Moore (boxer, born 1933) (1933–1963), American boxer

Other
 David Moore (military officer) (1817–1893), American military officer
 David Moore (photographer) (1927–2003), Australian photojournalist
 David Moore (restaurateur) (born 1964), restaurateur in the UK
 David Hastings Moore (1838–1915), American bishop of the Methodist Episcopal Church
 D. C. Moore (born 1980), British playwright
 David J. Moore, American businessman
 David S. Moore, American statistician
 David Moore, British photographer noted for his photographs of the Military citadels under London

See also
 Dave Moore (disambiguation)
 Davey Moore (disambiguation)